Kozo Watanabe may refer to:

Kozo Watanabe (engineer) (born 1942), Japanese automotive engineer for Nissan
Kōzō Watanabe (Democratic Party politician) (born 1932), Japanese politician
Kōzō Watanabe (Liberal Democratic Party politician) (1942–2007), Japanese politician